Birregurra railway station is located on the Warrnambool line in Victoria, Australia. It serves the town of Birregurra, and it opened on 13 March 1877.

History

Birregurra opened as the temporary terminus of the line from Winchelsea. On 27 July 1877, the line was extended to Colac.

At one time, the station was the junction of the Forrest branch line, which opened in December 1889, and closed in March 1957.

The former sheep and cattle race was abolished in 1973.

The station was one of the original 35 stations to be closed under the New Deal for Country Passengers in 1981, but it received a last-minute reprieve prior to the New Deal timetable being introduced.

All the sidings formerly provided have been removed, but the original station building remains on the platform, as well as an iron water tower behind it. In 1996, the run-down station building was restored under the auspices of the South Western Railway Society, utilising people employed through the Federal Government's New Work Opportunities scheme.

Platforms and services

Birregurra has one platform. It is serviced by V/Line Warrnambool line services.

Platform 1:
 services to Warrnambool and Southern Cross

References

External links
Victorian Railway Stations gallery

Railway stations in Australia opened in 1877
Regional railway stations in Victoria (Australia)
Shire of Colac Otway